Tinea apicimaculella is a species of moth of the  family Tineidae. It is found in North America (including Alabama, Illinois, Maryland, Massachusetts, Minnesota, North Carolina, Oklahoma, Ontario, Tennessee and Virginia).

References

External links
mothphotographersgroup

Moths described in 1875
Tineinae